Vinslöv is a locality situated in Hässleholm Municipality, Scania County, Sweden with 3,984 inhabitants in 2010.

Vinslöv Church is a medieval church which contains some of the earliest church murals in Sweden. In 1999, a documentary film portraying some of the town's inhabitants was produced. The documentary was called Plötsligt i Vinslöv (All of a sudden in Vinslöv).

References 

Populated places in Hässleholm Municipality
Populated places in Skåne County